"Since I Saw You Last" is a song by British singer-songwriter Gary Barlow. It was released in the United Kingdom on 14 April 2014 as the third and final single from his fourth solo album, Since I Saw You Last (2013). It was written by Barlow and produced by Steve Power.

Background
"Since I Saw You Last" tells the story of Barlow's struggle to become a successful solo artist after Take That split in 1996, and how the media backlash against him in favour of bandmate Robbie Williams left him in the verge of breakdown, leading to his eventual departure from his record label. Barlow described this song to Graham Norton as the song he always wanted to write but it was only now, after the success of Take That and his solo success that he felt it was time to record the song and release it as a single.

The song is described as one of survival against the odds and emerging stronger than before, where Gary passionately sings about being a 'dead man walking' and having to accept the events in the past and remember the lessons learned.

Music video
On the same day as the official announcement of the single release, Barlow revealed details for the official music video to accompany the song. Barlow asked fans to send him home movies and examples of them overcoming adversity that would appear within his music video, as a way of replicating his feelings of determination told in the song and demonstrating the resilience of human nature.

The new music video debuted on Barlow's Vevo page on 23 March 2014, shot in black and white, it shows Barlow performing the song and considering the past.

Track listing
CD promo single
 "Since I Saw You Last" (single mix) – 3:04
 "Since I Saw You Last" (instrumental version) – 3:32

Credits and personnel
Gary Barlow – songwriter, vocals, piano, additional keyboards, backing vocals
Steve Power – producer
Mark "Spike" Stent – mixer
Ryan Carline – engineer, additional keyboards, programming
Rohan Onraet – engineer, percussion, programming
Richard Lancaster – engineer
Tim van der Kuil – guitar
Dave Bronze – bass
Jeremy Stacey – drums
David Catlin-Birch – backing vocals
Nick Ingman – string arrangement
Perry Montague-Mason – string leader
Isobel Griffiths – musicians' contractor
Tony Cousins – mastering

Credits adapted from Since I Saw You Last liner notes.

Charts

References

2014 singles
Gary Barlow songs
Songs written by Gary Barlow
2013 songs
Song recordings produced by Steve Power
Polydor Records singles